Basera (lit. Dwelling) is a Hindi language soap opera that premiered on the Zee TV channel. The story portrays and illustrates the differences in living with a joint family compared to living in a nuclear family setup. The series was very popular among Indian audiences, especially women, and won one of the best ten serials on Indian television awards consecutively for two years. The series was ranked in the top 14 Indian television shows of the 2000s and received a TVR rating of 5.04.

Cast
 Alok Nath
 Arun Govil
 Ranjeet
 Satyendra Kapoor
 Kanchan
 Papiya Sengupta
 Chand Dhar
 Madhuri Sanjeev
 Rohit Kumar
 Shashi Sharma
 Hemant Choudhary
Sukanya Kulkarni

References

Basera Article on BizAsia

Indian television soap operas
Zee TV original programming
2000 Indian television series debuts
2001 Indian television series endings